Palaeophanes lativalva is a species of moth in the family Arrhenophanidae. It is only known from the type locality, which is situated in a wet forested area in the central mountain range of Taiwan, at an elevation of about 1,400 m.

The length of the forewings is 4.7–5 mm for males.

Etymology
The specific name is derived from the Latin latus (broad) and valva (leaf of a folding door, valve), in reference to the principal apomorphy of this species (the extremely broad valvae of the male genitalia).

External links
Family Arrhenophanidae

Arrhenophanidae
Moths described in 2003